The Marc Aaronson Memorial Lectureship, also known as the Aaronson Prize, is an award of the University of Arizona Department of Astronomy and Steward Observatory which promotes and recognizes excellence in astronomical research.  It is named after astronomer Marc Aaronson, who died in 1987 in an accident while making astronomical observations. He was 36 years old. 

The lectureship and cash prize are awarded every eighteen months to an individual or group who, by his or her passion for research and dedication to excellence, has produced a body of work in observational astronomy which has resulted in a significant deepening of our understanding of the universe. Any living scientist is eligible for this award without consideration of race, sex, or nationality. Fourteen previous Aaronson Prize winners are returning to Tucson on Apr 3–4, 2017, for a scientific symposium in Marc's honor.

Aaronson came to Steward Observatory as a postdoc after receiving his PhD degree from Harvard in 1977 and became an Associate Professor in 1983. His astronomical research focused on many of the most important problems of observational cosmology: the cosmic distance scale, the age of the Universe, the large-scale motion of matter, and the distribution of invisible mass in the Universe. Aaronson made important contributions to the understanding of stellar populations in the Large Magellanic Cloud. In recognition of his research achievements, Aaronson was awarded the George Van Biesbroeck Award  by the University of Arizona in 1981, the Bart J. Bok Prize by Harvard University in 1983, and the Newton Lacy Pierce Prize by the American Astronomical Society in 1984.

Recipients
Source: University of Arizona

See also

List of astronomy awards

References

 Aaronson Nomination Solicitation from 2003

University of Arizona